Pet Alien: An Intergalactic Puzzlepalooza, also known as simply Pet Alien, is a puzzle game developed by Shin'en Multimedia and published by The Game Factory for the Nintendo DS. It is based on the television series Pet Alien.

Gameplay
In An Intergalactic Puzzlepalooza players control the five aliens: Dinko, Gumpers, Flip, Swanky and Scruffy. They all have their special abilities, and the purpose of the game is to utilize these abilities in order to obtain certain gems that lie scattered around various levels. The player starts out controlling Gumpers, and as the player progresses throughout the game, the other aliens become unlocked.

The game centers on five aliens and their quest to save their Earthling friend Tommy Cadle. The aliens and Tommy Cadle are taken into space in Robotix's spaceship, where the aliens have to overcome numerous obstacles in order to save their friend.

Reception

The game received "mixed" reviews according to the review aggregation website Metacritic. GameZone gave the Australian version a mixed review, a month-and-a-half before its U.S. release date.

References

External links
 

2007 video games
Cartoon Network video games
Nintendo DS games
Nintendo DS-only games
Puzzle video games
Single-player video games
The Game Factory games
Video games based on animated television series
Video games developed in Germany